Pilgrim 100-B N709Y is one of a few surviving aircraft from the early days of aviation in the history of Alaska.  It is a single-engine aircraft, built as a Fairchild 100 Pilgrim in 1932 by the American Airplane & Engine Corporation, of a type where only 10 were produced.  This aircraft, and others like it, were used in the early days of Alaskan aviation to transport mail, people, and supplies, to all corners of the territory.  At the time of its listing on the National Register of Historic Places in 1986, it was the last Pilgrim that was still flightworthy and was stationed in Dillingham Airport.  It was acquired in 2001 by the Alaska Aviation Heritage Museum, which moved it to its actual location and uses it as a flying exhibit.

See also
National Register of Historic Places listings in Anchorage, Alaska

References
Notes

Bibliography

 "Fairchild 100." Aerofiles. Retrieved: 15 August 2009.
 Swanborough, F.G. and Peter M. Bowers. United States Military Aircraft since 1909. London: Putnam, 1963. .

External links
Photo

1930s United States airliners
100
Aircraft on the National Register of Historic Places
National Register of Historic Places in Anchorage, Alaska
Transportation on the National Register of Historic Places in Alaska
Individual aircraft
Single-engined tractor aircraft